Alessandro Machado Júnior Sousa (born 10 December 1985), known as Júnior,  is a Brazilian footballer who last played as a forward for FC Banants in the Armenian Premier League.

Júnior played for PFC Litex Lovech during the Bulgarian A PFG 2006–07 season. During the season 2008-2009 he played with FK Pelister in the Macedonian First League. Afterwards, playing with Armenian FC Banants he scored three league goals during the 2010 season.

References

1985 births
Living people
Association football forwards
Brazilian footballers
Brazilian expatriate footballers
PFC Litex Lovech players
Expatriate footballers in Bulgaria
First Professional Football League (Bulgaria) players
FK Pelister players
Expatriate footballers in North Macedonia
FC Urartu players
Expatriate footballers in Armenia
Armenian Premier League players